Rae is a village in Rae Parish, Harju County, in northern Estonia. It's located just southeast of the capital Tallinn. Rae has a population of 602 (as of 1 January 2010).

Rae Manor (Johannishof) was first mentioned in 1390. From the 16th century it belonged to the St. John's Almshouse, later it was owned by the city council (raad) of Tallinn. The single-story historicist stone main building was constructed in the 1850s.

Rae is bordered by the Tallinn–Tartu road (E263) to the southwest and the Tallinn Ring Road (nr. 11) to the southeast. The northeastern half of the village territory behind the Vaskjala–Ülemiste canal is covered by Rae bog.

Population

Gallery

References

External links
 Rae Manor at Estonian Manors Portal

Villages in Harju County